Germany competed at the 2013 World Aquatics Championships in Barcelona, Spain between 20 July to 4 August 2013.

Medalists

Diving

Germany nominated nine athletes to participate.

Men

Women

High diving

One athlete has qualified.

Open water swimming

Germany qualified seven athletes.

Men

Women

Mixed

Swimming

Germany nominated 28 athletes to participate.

Men

Women

Synchronized swimming

Four athletes have been nominated.

Water polo

Men's tournament

Team roster
Erik Bukowski
Dennis Eidner
Maurice Jüngling
Roger Kong
Erik Miers
Heiko Nossek
Moritz Oeler
Julian Real
Till Rohe
Moritz Schenkel
Andreas Schlotterbeck
Paul Schüler
Marko Stamm

Group D

Round of 16

References

External links
Official website

Nations at the 2013 World Aquatics Championships
2013 in German sport
Germany at the World Aquatics Championships